Philodendron crassinervium is a species of plant in the family Araceae.

It is native to southeast Brazil and is part of the section Baursia. In fact, it is the type species of this section. It has long lance-shaped leaves that point upwards with a large predominant midvein.  The midvein is used to store water for periods of drought that occur during the dry season. Along the midvein there are small red glands that produce a clear sap that results in a freckled-look on both sides of the leaves. The leaves themselves can grow to almost a meter long with a width of about 10 cm. Also, the plant has a climbing growth habit. The aerial roots of the plant are red when they first begin growing and later turn a dark brown with age.

The spadix of Philodendron crassinervium gets to about 20–25 cm long and is covered by a spathe that is white with shades of a dark red towards the bottom where the spadix emerges. The berries produced contain eight axile ovules in each ovary locule.

There are some species that resemble Philodendron crassinervium, such as Philodendron longilaminatum.

References
Lindl., Edwards's Botanical Register 23: t. 1958. 1837.
Curtis's Botanical Magazine, Vol. XI of new series, Vol. LXIV of whole work, Page 3621

crassinervium
Endemic flora of Brazil
Plants described in 1837